Harald de Vlaming (born 28 June 1954, Baarn – died 23 January 2023, Obergurgl was a sailor from the Netherlands, who represented his native country at the 1976 Summer Olympics  Kingston, Ontario, Canada. With helmsman Geert Bakker and fellow crew member Pieter Keijzer De Vlaming took the 5th place in the Soling. De Vlaming later specialized as crew in the Dragon, racing together with Ab Ekels and helmsman Pieter Keijzer.

Harald was retired from a career in the banking industry.

Sources
 
 
 
 
 
 
 
 

2023 deaths
1954 births
People from Baarn
Dutch male sailors (sport)
Dragon class sailors
Sailors at the 1976 Summer Olympics – Soling
Olympic sailors of the Netherlands
Sportspeople from Utrecht (province)